Aleksey Ivanovich Lebed (14 April 1955 – 27 April 2019) served as professional officer with the Soviet and Russian Airborne Forces, like his more prominent older brother, the late Alexander Lebed. After quitting military service in 1995 with the rank of colonel, he was elected chairman of the government of Khakassia Administrative Republic.  He came to the post in 1997, and was re-elected in 2000. Shortly after he came to power in 1997, the transmitter of the Sayansk television and radio company was cut off. Station chief Veniamin Striga said Lebed was responsible. In 2006 criminal charges were brought against Lebed related to claims of abuse of power. In 2009 Viktor Zimin took Lebed's position as the head of the government of Khakassia.

Aleksey Lebed died on 27 April, 2019, at the age of 64.

References

1955 births
2019 deaths
People from Novocherkassk
Communist Party of the Soviet Union members
United Russia politicians
Second convocation members of the State Duma (Russian Federation)
Fifth convocation members of the State Duma (Russian Federation)
Members of the Federation Council of Russia (1996–2000)
Heads of the Republic of Khakassia
Heads of government who were later imprisoned
Ryazan Guards Higher Airborne Command School alumni
Frunze Military Academy alumni